Nationality words link to articles with information on the nation's poetry or literature (for instance, Irish or France).

Events

George Crabbe writes to Edmund Burke asking for financial assistance. The outcome is the publication of Crabbe's poem The Library.

Works published

United Kingdom
 William Cowper, Anti-Thelyphthora, published anonymously (see also Martin Madan's Thelyphthora 1780)
 George Crabbe, The Library, published anonymously
 Anne Francis, A Poetical Translation of the Song of Solomon
 William Hayley, The Triumphs of Temper
 George Keate, Poetical Works
 Samuel Jackson Pratt, Sympathy; or, A Sketch of the Social Passion, published anonymously
 Anna Seward, Monody on Major André, on John André, hanged as a spy in the American Revolution

United States
 Philip Freneau, The British Prison-Ship: A Poem
 William Hayley, "The Triumphs of Temper: A Poem"
 Francis Hopkinson, The Temple of Minerva
 Anna Seward, Monody on Major Andre

Other
 Santa Rita Durão, Caramuru, Portuguese poem written in Brazil

Births
Death years link to the corresponding "[year] in poetry" article:
 January 26 – Ludwig Achim von Arnim (died 1831), German poet and novelist
 March 17 – Ebenezer Elliott (died 1849), English poet, known as the Corn Law rhymer
 September 12 – John Grieve (died 1836), Scottish poet
 November 6 – Lucy Aikin (died 1864), English writer of histories, poetry and novels and translator
 November 29 – Andrés Bello (died 1865), Venezuelan humanist, diplomat, poet, legislator, philosopher, educator and philologist
 December 25? – Sydney, Lady Morgan, née Owenson (died 1859), Irish novelist and poet

Deaths
Birth years link to the corresponding "[year] in poetry" article:
 January 6 – Mirza Mazhar Jan-e-Janaan (born 1699), Indian, Urdu-language poet, shot
 February 15 – Gotthold Ephraim Lessing (born 1729), German poet
 March 17 – Johannes Ewald (born 1743), Danish national dramatist and poet
 May 8 – Richard Jago (born 1715), English clergyman and poet
 June 25 – Samuel Gotthold Lange (born 1711), German poet
 November 4 – Johann Nikolaus Götz (born 1721), German poet
 Azar Bigdeli (died 1722), Persian anthologist and poet

See also

 List of years in poetry
 List of years in literature
 18th century in poetry
 18th century in literature
 French literature of the 18th century
 Sturm und Drang (the conventional translation is "Storm and Stress"; a more literal translation, however, might be "storm and urge", "storm and longing", "storm and drive" or "storm and impulse"), a movement in German literature (including poetry) and music from the late 1760s through the early 1780s
 List of years in poetry
 Poetry

Notes

18th-century poetry
Poetry